Hajime Tei (程 肇, テイ ハジメ born March 1959) is a Japanese neuroscientist specializing in the study of chronobiology. He currently serves as a professor at the Kanazawa University Graduate School of Natural Science & Technology. He is most notable for his contributions to the discovery of the mammalian period genes, which he discovered alongside Yoshiyuki Sakaki and Hitoshi Okamura.

Career 
Between 1991 and 1992, Tei was a fellow for the Fellowships of the Japan Society for Japanese Junior Scientists at the University of Tokyo’s Institute of Medical Science. He later held the position of assistant professor (1992-2001) and associate professor (2001-2004). During his time as an assistant professor, Tei worked alongside Yoshiyuki Sakaki and Hitoshi Okamura to discover the mammalian period genes Per1, Per2, and Per3. They also discovered the mammalian homolog of the Drosophila gene Timeless. In 2004, Tei became the principal investigator of the Laboratory of Chronogenomics at Mitsubishi Kagaku Institute of Life Sciences. In 2009, he became a full professor at the Kanazawa University Graduate School of Natural Science & Technology, a position he currently serves to-date.

Awards 
Hajime Tei received the 13th Tsukahara Memorial Award in 1999, and the Aschoff-Honma Prize for chronobiology in 2001.

Scientific contributions

Chronobiology

Discovery of mammalian Period genes 
In 1997, Hajime Tei, Yoshiyuki Sakaki, and Hitoshi Okamura identified the human and mouse Per homologues of the Drosophila Per gene. They discovered that hPer (the human homolog of dPer) and mPer (the mouse homolog of dPer) encoded PAS-domain-containing polypeptides that are highly homologous to dPer. They also found that mPer showed autonomous circadian oscillation in its expression in the suprachiasmatic nucleus (SCN) which acts as the primary circadian pacemaker in the mammalian brain. They were able to discover this by using a method called intra-module scanning-polymerase chain reaction (IMS-PCR), which allowed them to screen out short stretches of DNA sequences and isolate mammalian homologs of the Drosophila Per gene.

Identification of mammalian Timeless homolog 
In 1998, Hajime Tei, in collaboration with other researchers, identified a mammalian homolog of the Drosophila timeless gene. During this research project, timeless was analyzed in the adult mouse SCN, but only weak oscillations were observed.

Discovery of circadian clocks in peripheral organs 
Tei and Shin Yamazaki developed the first rodent model that was used to monitor circadian gene expression rhythms. This was done using a luciferase reporter gene expressed under the Per1. In 2000, using their rodent model, they discovered the existence of circadian clocks in peripheral organs of mammals. This discovery led to the current understanding of mammalian circadian control as a multi-oscillatory system. He was also part of a team that discovered feeding cycles can entrain liver independently of the suprachiasmatic nucleus (SCN) and the light cycle.

Calcium flux in mammalian pacemaker neurons

In 2005, Tei, G. Lundkvist, Y. Kwak, E. Davis, and G. Block proposed that the molecular clock was linked to neurons' membrane potential via voltage-dependent regulation of Ca2+ influx, as well as secondary action of intracellular Ca2+ on gene transcription. Additionally, the same study found that removal of Ca2+ from the medium, as well as blocking the Ca2+ channels, stopped the SCN's circadian clock, while hyperpolarization of a K+ medium led to altered rhythms in the SCN.

Regulation of bone resorption by circadian clocks 
In 2016, a research team that included Tei discovered that clock genes, most specifically Bmal1 and Per1, are rhythmically expressed in osteoblasts to modulate the osteoblast-dependent regulation of osteoclastogenesis by regulating 1,25(OH)2D3-induced Rankl expression in osteoblasts. Specifically for Bmal1, they found that Bmal1-deficient osteoblasts promote osteoclastogenesis. These findings could lead to future studies of RAR patterns and bone turnover markers.

Timeline of contributions

Applications of scientific contributions 
Tei holds a patent on a Per1 promoter sequence that, when operably linked to another gene, will rhythmically promote its transcription. This promoter sequence allows for the creation of transgenic animals that will be useful in studying circadian disorders and diseases. Additionally, pharmaceutical treatments for such diseases can be tested on transgenic animals with this specific promoter.

Collaborators 
From early in his professional career to his work current projects, Tei has worked with many other chronobiologists. Specifically, he is listed as a recurring co-author with the following scientists:
 Yoshiyuki Sakaki
 Shin Yamazaki
 Gene D. Block
 Rika Numano
 Michael Menaker

References 

Chronobiologists
1959 births
Living people
Japanese neuroscientists
University of Tokyo alumni
Academic staff of Kanazawa University